Sematopoda is a genus of flies in the family Empididae.

Species
S. elata Collin, 1928

References

Empidoidea genera
Empididae